Kohneh Ab (also Romanized as Kohneh Āb) is a village in Qasabeh-ye Gharbi Rural District, in the Central District of Sabzevar County, Razavi Khorasan Province, Iran. At the 2006 census, its population was 199, in 53 families.

References 

Populated places in Sabzevar County